Md. Mokbul Hossain is an independent politician and the incumbent Member of the Bangladesh Parliament from Meherpur-2.

Early life
Hossain was born on 17 January 1954. He completed his studies up to Higher Secondary School Certificate or grade 12.

Career
Hossain was elected to Parliament on 5 January 2014 from Meherpur-2 as an independent candidate.

He was involved in a clash with political rivals in 2010.

References

Awami League politicians
Living people
1935 births
10th Jatiya Sangsad members
7th Jatiya Sangsad members